Lennox Roger Stewart (21 September 1949 – 17 June 2021) was a Trinidadian middle-distance runner. He competed in the men's 800 metres at the 1972 Summer Olympics.

References

External links
 

1949 births
2021 deaths
Athletes (track and field) at the 1971 Pan American Games
Athletes (track and field) at the 1972 Summer Olympics
Trinidad and Tobago male middle-distance runners
Olympic athletes of Trinidad and Tobago
Place of birth missing
Pan American Games competitors for Trinidad and Tobago